The 1950–51 Iraq FA Basra League was the third season of the Iraq FA Basra League (the top division of football in Basra from 1948 to 1973) organised by the Basra branch of the Iraq Football Association. The tournament began on 7 November 1950 and the regular season ended in January 1951 with Sharikat Naft Al-Basra and Thanawiyat Al-Basra qualifying for the final. Sharikat Naft Al-Basra won the final to clinch the title for the second consecutive time.

Regular season

Results

Final

References

External links
 Iraqi Football Website

Iraq FA Basra League seasons
Iraq
1950 in Iraqi sport
1951 in Iraqi sport